Aşağıoba (also, Ashaghyoba) is a village in the Khachmaz District of Azerbaijan. The village forms part of the municipality of Seyidlikendyeri.

References 

Populated places in Khachmaz District